KYBU (96.9 FM) is a radio station licensed to serve the community of Covelo, California. The station is owned by Friends of the Round Valley Public Library, and airs a variety format.

The station was assigned the call sign KQZT by the Federal Communications Commission on May 23, 2007. The station changed its call sign to KYBU on December 7, 2011.

References

External links
 Official Website
 

YBU
Radio stations established in 2011
2011 establishments in California
Variety radio stations in the United States
Community radio stations in the United States
Mendocino County, California